The basement of the White House, the Washington, D.C. residence and workplace of the president of the United States, is located under the North Portico and includes the White House carpenters' shop, engineers' shop, bowling alley, flower shop, and dentist office, among other areas.

The White House Situation Room is located in the basement beneath the West Wing.

History 
During World War II, a bomb shelter was constructed under the East Wing, later converted into the Presidential Emergency Operations Center.

The sub-basement was added during the reconstruction of the White House under Harry S. Truman. It contains storage space, the laundry, elevator control machinery, the water softener, and incinerator, as well as dressing rooms for White House performers.

Dwight Eisenhower made the first White House television broadcast from a special room in the basement in 1953, though the "broadcast room" was soon divided for other purposes.

A bowling alley was added by Richard Nixon in 1973. There had previously been a bowling alley in the West Wing, built for President Truman in 1947, which had been moved to the Old Executive Office Building in 1955.

After the Recording Industry Association of America suggested that the White House Library should be expanded to include sound recordings, that trade group donated over 2,200 LPs during the Nixon and Carter administrations; when Ronald Reagan took office, the collection was moved to the White House basement, where it is still located.

References

Further reading 
Seale, William. The President's House. Washington, D.C.: White House Historical Association, 1987.

External links

 Basement and Sub-basement from whitehousemuseum.org, an unofficial website about the White House

basement
Subterranea of the United States
Continuity of government in the United States